Angela Warnick Buchdahl (born July 8, 1972) is an American rabbi. She was the first Asian-American to be ordained as a rabbi, and the first Asian-American to be ordained as a hazzan (cantor). In 2011 she was named by Newsweek and The Daily Beast as one of America's "Most Influential Rabbis", and in 2012 by The Daily Beast as one of America's "Top 50 Rabbis". Buchdahl was recognized as one of the top five in The Forwards 2014 "Forward Fifty", a list of American Jews who had the most impact on the national scene in the previous year.

Early life 
Buchdahl was born in Seoul, South Korea, to a Japanese-born Korean Buddhist mother, Sulja Yi Warnick, and Frederick David Warnick, an American Ashkenazi Reform Jew, whose ancestors emigrated from Bacău County, Romania, and Russia to the United States.

At the age of five, Buchdahl moved to the United States with her family. She was raised Jewish, attending Temple Beth El in Tacoma, Washington, which her great-grandparents had assisted in founding a century before. Like her mother, she became very involved in temple activities, and became a leader in school and within the youth group. She attended Stadium High School in Tacoma. At the age of 16, she visited Israel through Bronfman youth fellowships with other Jewish teenagers from the U.S., and for the first time had the authenticity of her Judaism questioned by an Orthodox roommate who believed that only children of a Jewish mother can be Jewish; the experience was a painful one. As a college student, she spent her summers working as head song leader at Camp Swig, a Reform Jewish camp in Saratoga, California. At the age of 21 she underwent Orthodox conversion or giyur, which she views as a "reaffirmation ceremony".

Buchdahl attended Yale University, where she was one of the first female members of Skull and Bones, a secret student society which counts former President George W. Bush and United States Secretary of State John Kerry as members. During her time at Yale, she met her husband Jacob Buchdahl, now an attorney. She earned a Bachelor of Arts degree in Religious Studies from Yale University in 1994 and began her cantorial and rabbinic studies at Hebrew Union College.

Career

Early years
In 1999, Buchdahl was invested as a cantor, and in 2001, she was ordained as a rabbi by Hebrew Union College-Jewish Institute of Religion, a seminary for Reform Judaism.  She was the first Asian-American to be ordained as a rabbi, and the first Asian-American to be ordained as a hazzan (cantor) anywhere in the world. She became assistant rabbi and cantor at Westchester Reform Temple, which in 2003 had membership of over 1,200 families.

Buchdahl joined Central Synagogue, a large Reform congregation in Manhattan, as senior cantor in 2006. During her tenure as of 2012, Friday night attendance at the synagogue had doubled, post-bar mitzvah retention had tripled, and the waiting list for membership had risen to over 300.

Senior Rabbi at Central Synagogue
In 2013, Buchdahl was named the Senior Rabbi of the Central Synagogue. She is the first woman and the first Asian-American to be their Senior Rabbi. On July 1, 2014, Buchdahl succeeded Peter Rubinstein as Senior Rabbi at Central Synagogue. She is the first woman and first Asian-American to hold the post in the Synagogue's long history, and one of only a few women serving as leaders of a major U.S. synagogue. Central Synagogue has membership of over 7,000, over $30 million in endowment, and approximately 100 full-time employees.

In December 2014, she was welcomed by President Barack Obama to lead the prayers at the White House Hanukkah celebration. At the podium, Buchdahl commented on how special the scene was, asking the President if he believed America's founding fathers could possibly have pictured that a female Asian-American rabbi would one day be at the White House leading Jewish prayers in front of the African-American president. Her speech on the meaning of Hannukah and religious freedom met with applause and cheers. Writer Abigail Pogrebin, who also served as President of Central Synagogue (where Buchdahl is Senior Rabbi), noted that as Buchdahl "stood alongside the African-American president and led us in the Hebrew blessing over the candles, there was a moving magnificence both in that unlikely tableau and in the sound of a Jewish prayer filling The People's house".

On March 22, 2019, Buchdahl opened the doors of Central Synagogue to hundreds of worshipers from a nearby mosque ravaged by fire.

In December 2019, the Jewish Telegraphic Agency named her among the Jews who defined the 2010s, and stated, "The choice of Buchdahl to replace the retiring Rabbi Peter Rubinstein elevated a woman and a Jew of color to a position of virtually unprecedented prominence in the Jewish world and made Buchdahl a potent symbol of the changing face of American Judaism."

On January 15, 2022, Buchdahl was called by and spoke with the hostage-taker in the Colleyville synagogue hostage crisis at the Congregation Beth Israel synagogue in Colleyville, Texas. The hostage taker said that he had a bomb, and asked Buchdahl to use her position of influence to secure Aafia Siddiqui's release from prison. After the call, Buchdahl immediately contacted law enforcement.

Buchdahl conducts interfaith weddings at Central Synagogue for couples who say they "are committed to creating a Jewish household". She appears in the PBS documentary 18 Voices Sing Kol Nidre.

Other activities
Buchdahl has served as faculty for the Wexner Heritage Foundation and for the Union for Reform Judaism (URJ) Kallot programs, and on the boards of Auburn Theological Seminary, Avodah Jewish Service Corps, UJA Federation, and the Jewish Multiracial Network.

Honors
In 2011 Buchdahl was named by Newsweek and The Daily Beast as one of America's "Most Influential Rabbis", and in 2012 by The Daily Beast as one of America's "Top 50 Rabbis". Buchdahl was recognized as one of the top five in The Forwards 2014 "Forward Fifty", a list of American Jews who had the most impact on the national scene in the previous year. The art exhibit “Holy Sparks”, which opened in February 2022 at the Heller Museum and the Skirball Museum, featured 24 Jewish women artists, who had each created an artwork about a female rabbi who was a first in some way. Laurie Gross created the artwork about Buchdahl.

See also
Timeline of women rabbis

References

Further reading 

 "Cantor Angela Warnick Buchdahl - the face of the modern Jew", Jewish Times Asia, September 2008
 "Kimchee On the Seder Plate"
 The Jewish Future—Commentary Symposium

1972 births
American people of Romanian-Jewish descent
American Reform rabbis
Hebrew Union College – Jewish Institute of Religion alumni
Living people
Clergy from Seoul
Religious leaders from New York City
South Korean emigrants to the United States
Women hazzans
Reform women rabbis
Yale College alumni
21st-century American women singers
21st-century American Jews